Torgnon (Issime ) is a town and comune in the Aosta Valley region of north-western Italy.

References

Cities and towns in Aosta Valley